Typhoon Phanfone, known in the Philippines as Typhoon Neneng, was a powerful tropical cyclone which affected Japan in early October 2014. It was the eighteenth named storm and the eighth typhoon of the 2014 Pacific typhoon season.

Meteorological history

Early on September 29, the JTWC upgraded the system to a tropical storm, shortly before the JMA also upgraded it to a tropical storm and named it Phanfone. Tracking along the southern periphery of the subtropical ridge, the storm intensified very slowly for two days, although conditions remained favorable. Late on September 30, the JMA upgraded Phanfone to a severe tropical storm, right before the JTWC upgraded it to a typhoon. After the JMA also upgraded Phanfone to a typhoon at noon on October 1, the system started to deepen more rapidly when tracking along the southwestern periphery of a deep-layered subtropical ridge. Under low vertical wind shear and good dual channel outflow enhanced by the mid-latitude westerlies to the north, Phanfone formed a pinhole eye early on October 2. According to the JMA, Phanfone reached peak intensity with ten-minute maximum sustained winds at 175 km/h (110 mph) at 06:00 UTC, and it also became equivalent to the category 4 strength on the Saffir–Simpson hurricane wind scale. Soon, the eye became cloud-filled and formed a secondary eyewall, suggesting an eyewall replacement cycle.

The PAGASA named the typhoon Neneng when it entered the Philippine Area of Responsibility early on October 3. In addition, Phanfone formed a ragged and large eye, indicating the completion of the eyewall replacement cycle. Early on October 4, the JTWC upgraded Phanfone to a super typhoon when it was located about 170 km (105 mi) east-southeast of Minamidaitōjima. As the system started to tap into the mid-latitude westerlies, it was in an area of strong vertical wind shear offset by vigorous outflow, namely the improved poleward channel. Only six hours later, the JTWC downgraded Phanfone back to a typhoon owing to the loosening spiral banding. At noon, the JMA analysed that Phanfone started to weaken. The convective tops of the system intermittently warmed up afterwards, but the ragged and large eye still maintained well. Phanfone sharply recurved and accelerated northeastward early on the next day, tracking along the western edge of the deep-layered subtropical ridge.

Typhoon Phanfone passed near the southern coast of Kii Peninsula around 03:00 JST on October 6 (18:00 UTC on October 5). The eye immediately dissipated, as well as the system started to undergo extratropical transition right before making landfall near Hamamatsu of the Shizuoka Prefecture in Japan after 08:00 JST (23:00 UTC on October 5). The JTWC issued the final warning to Phanfone early on October 6, and the system completely became extratropical at noon. The storm stopped weakening and began to deepen again early on October 7, and it crossed the International Date Line as a powerful extratropical cyclone early the next day. Post-Tropical Cyclone Phanfone, which was located about 890 km (555 mi) southwest of Unalaska, Alaska, reached peak intensity of its extratropical period at noon on October 8, with a barometric pressure of 948 hPa (27.99 inHg) and hurricane-force winds. The system started to weaken again early on October 9, and it turned northward early on October 11. The system eventually moved inland over Southcentral Alaska early on October 12 and dissipated later that day.

Preparations and impact
The extratropical remnant of Phanfone brought locally strong winds to portions of the Alaskan Peninsula from October 12–13. Moisture associated with Phanfone later fueled a separate cyclone over the Gulf of Alaska which brought heavy rains to parts of British Columbia, Canada.

Mariana Islands
On September 29, the National Weather Service office in Guam issued a tropical storm watch for Saipan, Tinian, and the Northern Mariana Islands in anticipation of Phanfone's arrival the following day. This was subsequently upgraded to a tropical storm warning and accompanied by a small craft advisory and a flash flood watch. A typhoon watch was also raised for Alamagan and Pagan that evening. At 10:40 a.m. local time (00:40 UTC) Northern Mariana Islands Governor Eloy Inos declared a level one Tropical Cyclone Condition of Readiness. All non-essential government employees were sent home shortly thereafter. Public and private schools suspended classes on September 30 and October 1 while Northern Marianas College closed only for September 30. Six public shelters were opened at schools across Saipan; however, no one utilized them. An "all clear" was issued for Saipan and Tinian after the storm's passage during the evening of September 30 and for the remainder of the Mariana Islands the following day.

Japan

Phanfone started affecting Japan late on October 4, as it began weakening. High waves and winds of 90 mph (150 km/h) were reported most in southern Japan. At the Kadena Air Base, the typhoon killed a U.S. airman and left two others missing after they were swept out to sea. It was also reported that 10 people were injured and nearly 10,000 houses were without power. On October 5, Phanfone also affected the Formula One 2014 Japanese Grand Prix, bringing strong winds and heavy rainfall which made the track surface wet and significantly reduced visibility. Because of this, the race had to be red flagged twice; the first time because the torrential rain made conditions too treacherous to race in and the second time because of a fatal accident involving Jules Bianchi, which was partially caused by the wet track conditions.

In Japan, a total of eleven people were killed by the typhoon, with several others missing or injured.

Heavy rains from the typhoon worsened the spread of radioactive materials in groundwater around the Fukushima I and Fukushima II nuclear power plants, which suffered nuclear meltdowns in 2011 following a MW9.0 earthquake and subsequent tsunami. Levels of the radioactive hydrogen isotope tritium soared ten-fold from the previous month to 150,000 becquerels per liter. Strontium-90, a substance known to cause bone cancer, rose to a record 1.2 million becquerels per liter. A separate sampling site showed a doubling in the levels of a beta particle-emitting substance from prior to the typhoon.

Throughout Shizuoka Prefecture, 8 buildings were destroyed and a further 1,439 buildings were damaged by flooding. Losses in the prefecture amounted to ¥3.21 billion (US$29.5 million). Agricultural damage in Japan was calculated at ¥7.7 billion (US$70.7 million), while total economic losses nationwide were estimated at ¥10.5 billion (US$100 million) by Aon Benfield.

See also

Other typhoons named Phanfone
Typhoon Melor (2009)
Typhoon Wipha (2013)
Typhoon Vongfong (2014)
Typhoon Chaba (2016)
Typhoon Lan (2017)
Typhoon Trami (2018)

References

External links

JMA General Information of Typhoon Phanfone (1418) from Digital Typhoon
JMA Best Track Data of Typhoon Phanfone (1418) 

Typhoon Phanfone
2014 Pacific typhoon season
Phanfone 2014
Phanfone 2014
Phanfone 2014
Phanfone 2014
September 2014 events in Asia
October 2014 events in Asia
September 2014 events in Oceania
October 2014 events in Oceania
Phanfone